Danylo Valeriyovych Sahutkin (born 19 April 1996) is a Ukrainian football player who plays for Akron Tolyatti.

Club career
He made his Ukrainian Second League debut for FC Shakhtar-3 Donetsk on 2 August 2014 in a game against FC Krystal Kherson.

References

External links
 

1996 births
Sportspeople from Sevastopol
Living people
Piddubny Olympic College alumni
Ukrainian footballers
Ukrainian expatriate footballers
Ukraine youth international footballers
Ukraine under-21 international footballers
Association football defenders
FC Shakhtar Donetsk players
FC Shakhtar-3 Donetsk players
FC Arsenal Kyiv players
FC Yenisey Krasnoyarsk players
FC Mariupol players
FC Akron Tolyatti players
Ukrainian Premier League players
Ukrainian Second League players
Russian First League players
Expatriate footballers in Russia
Ukrainian expatriate sportspeople in Russia